Our Nell is a musical with a book by Louis N. Parker and Reginald Arkell and music by Harold Fraser-Simson and Ivor Novello. It is based on the life of the English actress Nell Gwynn, mistress of Charles II. It was inspired by an earlier musical Our Peg by Edward Knoblock, that premiered in 1919 based on the life of the eighteenth century actress Peg Woffington.

Our Nell premiered in April 1924 and ran for 140 performances at the Gaiety Theatre in London's West End with a cast that included Arthur Wontner, Walter Passmore, Miles Malleson, Reginald Bach, Amy Augarde and Jose Collins in the title role.

References

Bibliography
 Wearing, J. P. The London Stage 1920–1929: A Calendar of Productions, Performers, and Personnel. Rowman & Littlefield, 2014.

1924 musicals
British musicals
West End musicals
Plays set in the 17th century
Plays set in London
Plays by Louis N. Parker
Musicals by Ivor Novello
Nell Gwyn